The 2022–23 Swiss Cup, or Schweizer Pokal, is the 98th season of Switzerland's annual football cup competition. It features 64 teams from the first to the eight tier of the Swiss football league. The first round will be played from 19 to 21 August 2022. The final will take place on 4 June 2023.

FC Lugano is the reigning Cup champion.

Participating Teams
{| class="wikitable" 
|-  style="vertical-align:top; background:#9cc;"
|  style="text-align:center; width:14%;"| 2022-23 Super League10 teams
|  style="text-align:center; width:14%;"| 2022-23 Challenge League9 teams
|  style="text-align:center; width:14%;"| 2022-23 Promotion League9 teams
|  style="text-align:center; width:14%;"| 2022-23 1. Liga14 teams
|  style="text-align:center; width:14%;"| 2022-23 2. Liga Interregional5 teams
|  style="text-align:center; width:14%;"| 2022-23 2. Liga12 teams
|  style="text-align:center; width:14%;"| 2022-23 Regional lower leagues5 teams
|- valign="top"
| 
FC Basel
Grasshopper Club Zürich
FC Lugano
FC Luzern
Servette FC
FC Sion
FC St. Gallen 1879
FC Winterthur
BSC Young Boys
FC Zürich
|
FC Aarau
AC Bellinzona
FC Lausanne-Sport
FC Stade Lausanne-Ouchy
FC Schaffhausen
FC Thun
FC Wil 1900
Neuchâtel Xamax FCS
Yverdon-Sport FC
|
FC Bavois
FC Bulle
FC Breitenrain
SC Cham
FC Chiasso
Étoile Carouge FC
SC Kriens
FC Stade Nyonnais
FC Rapperswil-Jona
|
CS Chênois
FC Grand-Saconnex
FC Köniz
FC Kreuzlingen
FC La Chaux-de-Fonds
FC Linth 04
Meyrin FC
FC Muri
FC Portalban/Gletterens
FC Rotkreuz
FC Schötz
FC Solothurn
FC Wettswil-Bonstetten
FC Wohlen
|
FC Gambarogno-Contone
FC Ibach
CS Italien GE
FC Rorschach-Goldach 17
FC Widnau
|
FC Allschwil
FC Arbedo-Castione
ASI Audax-Friul
FC Bischofszell
FC Bosporus
FC Gland
FC Littau
FC Sarmenstorf
FC Saxon Sports
FC Schoenberg
FC Subingen
FC Wiedikon ZH
|
3. Liga
FC Affoltern am Albis
Compesières FC
FC Goldstern
FC Wittenbach
4. Liga
FC Sternenberg

Schedule and Venues
The table below shows the schedule of the competition. Home advantage for the first five rounds is granted to the team from the lower league, if applicable. The final will be held at Stadion Wankdorf, Bern.
{| class="wikitable" style="text-align:center"
|-
!Round
!Match date
|-
|Round 1 (round of 64)
|19-21 August 2022
|-
|Round 2 (round of 32)
|16-18 September 2022
|-
|Round 3 (round of 16)
|8/9 November 202231 January - 1 February 2023
|-
|Round 4 (Quarter-finals)
|28 February - 2 March 2023
|-
|Round 5 (Semi-finals)
|4-6 April 2023
|-
|Round 6 (final)
|4 June 2023
|-

Results

Round 1
The matches of the first round were drawn on 5 July 2022 and will take place between 19 and 21 August 2022. Teams of the Swiss Challenge League and the Swiss Super League cannot be drawn against each other. Teams in bold continued to the next round of the competition.

Round 2
The matchups of the second round were drawn on 21 August 2022, following the conclusion of the first round. Teams of the Swiss Super League cannot be drawn against each other. The matches will be held between 16 and 18 September 2022.

Round 3
The matchups of the third round were drawn on 18 September 2022, following the conclusion of the second round. Six of the eight matches will be held on 8 and 9 November 2022. Due to the league match between FC Luzern and FC Basel being postponed to 9 November 2022, their games are scheduled for 31 January and 1 February 2023, respectively.

Quarter-finals
The quarter-finals were drawn on 9 November 2022. The matches will be held between 28 February and 2 March 2023.

Semi-finals
The semi-finals were drawn on 4 March 2023. Following the elimination of FC Thun and FC Rotkreuz of the Swiss Challenge League and the 1. Liga, respectively, only teams of the Swiss Super League remain.

Final
The final will be held on 4 June 2023 in Stadion Wankdorf.

Notes

References

External links
 Homepage

Swiss Cup seasons
Swiss Cup
Cup